Pablo Rodríguez Flores (born 8 March 1955) is a Spanish retired professional footballer who played as a left winger.

Club career
Born in Turón (Mieres), Asturias, Rodríguez arrived at Valencia CF from local giants Sporting de Gijón, going on to compete several seasons with the reserves. He made his debut with the first team on 8 April 1978 in a 7–0 home rout of Rayo Vallecano, but would only appear in a combined ten La Liga games in his first two seasons.

In the following four years, Rodríguez was a relatively important attacking unit for the Che, playing an average of 21 league matches. He contributed with six appearances and one goal as the club won the 1980 UEFA Cup Winners' Cup, including the full 120 minutes in the final against Arsenal, where he also converted his penalty shootout attempt.

Rodríguez retired in June 1986 at the age of 31, after one-season spells with UD Salamanca (Segunda División, team relegation) and Levante UD (lower leagues).

Honours
Valencia
Copa del Rey: 1978–79
UEFA Cup Winners' Cup: 1979–80
UEFA Super Cup: 1980

References

External links

CiberChe stats and bio 

1955 births
Living people
Spanish footballers
Footballers from Asturias
Association football wingers
La Liga players
Segunda División players
Segunda División B players
Tercera División players
Valencia CF Mestalla footballers
Valencia CF players
UD Salamanca players
Levante UD footballers